Warszawska Fabryka Motocykli, commonly known by its initials WFM, is a defunct Polish motorcycle manufacturer. The motorcycles were manufactured in a  factory located at 25 Ulica Mińska in the Warsaw district of Grochów.

History
The Warszawskich Zakładów Naprawy Samochodów was established in 1947 by the amalgamation of the state-run Zakłady Urządzeń Transportowego No. 2 and the Państwowe Zakłady Samochodowych No. 2. Amongst other activities, the workshop produced SHL M04 motorcycles for SHL from  pre-war spares from Huta Ludwików and DKW engines. Later the engine designed for the Sokół 125 cc was used. The factory turned exclusively to motorcycle production in 1951 and the name was changed to Warszawska Fabryka Motocykli (WFM). The first motorcycles were delivered in 1952.

Initially they produced 125 cc motorcycles for Wytwórni Sprzętu Komunikacyjnego of Psie Pole and SHL of Kielce. From 1955, WFM produced their own branded motorcycles and scooters and also supplied engines and  components to other motorcycle manufacturers.

Wacław Laskowski was the factory director for many years. 

On 1 January 1965, the WFM plant was merged with the neighbouring Polish Optical Works (PZO) and production of motorcycles was gradually phased out. The WFM machinery was taken over by PZO, who continued to produce engines and spare parts.

Models

Initial production was manufacturing the M04 for SHL, 27,000 machines were built between 1952 and June 1954. This model was superseded by the SHL M05, which had telescopic forks. 12,500 units of the M05 were built.

WFM M06

The 1955 M06 was the first model branded as a WFM. It was a development of the SHL M05 and used the same 123 cc S-01 engine. The cycle parts were copied from the SHL M05 model, which had swinging arm rear suspension. An export model was produced with a battery, electric horn and chromed wheel rims. The domestic model received these refinements in 1957. Upgrades to the carburettor and cylinder head were made in 1958. A new more powerful engine, the S-34, was fitted in 1963. By the time production ended in March 1966, around 600,000 motorcycles of this model had been produced.

WFM M16 Tarpan
A successor for the M06 was planned in 1962. It was to be a new design and able to compete with machines from Jawa and MZ. The machine had a spine frame and leading link forks. A new 175 cc engine was designed which featured a 5 speed gearbox, but never got off the drawing board. A few prototypes were made using the existing S32 engine, but the machine never went into production.

WFM Osa

In 1955, WFM designed 3 prototype scooters, all named after insects: Żuk (beetle), Bąk (bee) and Osa (wasp). There was resistance from the authorities towards what they viewed as a "ideologically hostile" product, and pre-production models of the Osa weren't produced until February 1959. The scooter used a 148 cc single-cylinder, two-stroke engine, designated S 06, which WFM had been supplying to SHL. The machine used 14 inch wheels. The machine went into full production as the Osa M50.

In 1962 the Osa M52 was introduced. This was fitted with the 175 cc S 33 engine. Much of the production of the M52 was exported to India. Production of the M50 was stopped in 1963 and the M52 in 1965.

Competitions
WFM entered factory teams in a number of ISDT events between 1956 and 1963, including the 1959 17th International Tatra Rally, the 1960 XXXV Sześciodniówce FIM in Bad Aussee, Austria and the 1961 Scottish Sześciodniówce. Both 125 cc motorcyles and Osa scooters were used.

Production 1951–1965 
 Motorcycles - 600,000
 Scooters - 28,000
 Engines - 250,000 units

Resurrection
At the beginning of the 21st century, a project was created to reactivate the WFM brand in cooperation with the Minsk Motovelo Motorbike and Bicycle Factory in Belarus. The originator of the project was Włodzimierz Gąsiorek, who owned the WFM trademark through the Motor Klub Wawer. The motorcycle was a modification of the Minsk Lider, and was available in 50 cc and 125 cc versions.

References

Bibliography

External links

 
 

Motorcycle manufacturers of Poland
1951 establishments in Poland
1966 disestablishments in Poland
Science and technology in Poland
Polish brands
Manufacturing companies based in Warsaw